The International Cartoonists Exhibition is an annual art exhibition held in Rapallo, Liguria, Italy. Founded in 1972, it was one of the earliest Italian exhibitions devoted to comics. Conceived in order to popularize and increase the importance of work done by comic authors, it was the first exhibition of its kind to display original artwork. It is one of the few comics-related activities to have been founded and always directed by professional authors of the field, beginning with Carlo Chendi, an Italian cartoonist and Disney Italy screenwriter and the cartoonists Luciano Bottaro and Giorgio Rebuffi, who founded the Studio Bierreci; other collaborators include the restaurateur Fausto Oneto, the designer Enrico Macchiavello (famous for Ceres beer commercials) and the official site's owner, Davide Caci.

Rapalloonia! 
Rapalloonia! is a cultural association which pursues the promotion of comics, cartoons and related art forms, through channels of information and culture. The arms of Rapalloonia! were  designed by the musician and actor Luigi Maio. Since 2014, the association's president has been Davide Caci, who became president after Carlo Chendi, one of the association's founders and current honorary president. Rapalloonia! works with partners to promote comics as a form of expression and means of communication. Some of these non-profit organizations include Comune di Rapallo, Regione Liguria, Provincia di Genova and UNICEF.

History 
The exhibition's organization was originally dedicated to two main categories: the cartoonists, and the readers. The aim of the exhibition was to show how a comic page is born, illuminating the processes by which pictures are drawn by hand before being photographed and downsized, ready for print. The first exhibition, in 1972, showed the work of cartoonists from eight different countries. As with the 1973 show, no particular theme was selected for exhibition. However, the 1974 exhibition was given the subject of women in comics, as main characters and as authors. This show was an enormous success, drawing attention from the mass media. Special guests Oriana Fallaci and Natalia Aspesi wrote articles in their respective newspapers, and RAI (Italy's national public broadcasting company) reported on the exhibition on national television.

Following shows have continued similarly, with various themes being chosen for exhibition. One was dedicated to Corriere dei Piccoli; two to publishing house (Edizioni Alpe and Edizioni Bianconi), two to Cristoforo Colombo; three to comic schools: the Connecticut school (Mort Walker, Dik Browne and many others) and to Italian schools Strisce di Terra ("Strips of Earth") and Strisce di Mare ("Strips of the Sea"); one to the cartoon heroes of the western world; one to satire; one to the topic of Christmas, made in Milan and Rapallo, connected to fundraising for the charity Francesca Rava N.P.H. that helps children of Haiti and of other Caribbean countries; five dedicated to famous characters: Martin Mystère, Ken Parker, Paperinik, Julia and Dylan Dog; two to the sea: Nuvole d’acqua salata ("Clouds of saltwater") and Mare a strisce ("Sea of comic strips"); one to Magie e Incantesimi ("Spells and Enchantments"); one to W.I.T.C.H; and one to the music with the title Note a fumetti (loosely "music to comics"). Finally, six shows were dedicated to different authors: Luciano Bottaro, Ivo Milazzo, Silver, Ro Marcenaro and Carl Barks. For the first time, one was dedicated to Idee e Creatività ("ideas and creativity"), to demonstrate that without an idea, story or screenplay, cartoons cannot exist: the four screenwriters are Tiziano Sclavi, Giancarlo Berardi, Carlo Chendi and François Corteggiani.

For every exhibition, the organisation has edited books (between 70–120 pages) with large-size pages, coloured or in black and white. They are catalogues and monographic publications based on the theme chosen for each exhibition. The cartoonists' exhibition has not only been held in Rapallo, having travelled over the years, and collaborated with other cartoonist events hosted in other places. The exhibition has twice moved to the site of Lucca Comics & Games, and has collaborated with Strisce d'Africa ("Comic Strips of Africa"), dedicated to the European and American cartoons stories set in Africa and to those created by indigenous authors. The show has also collaborated in Venice with Venezia nel fumetto ("Venice in comics").

Editions 
The exhibition in these 40 years had different themes: below the most appreciated and remembered editions for newspapers and websites: the 33rd edition of 2005 was dedicated to Carl Barks: as always between guests there were international guests, between them, Carl Barks' Fan Club and Don Rosa, the natural heir of Barks.

The 34th edition there was in November 2006, and it had as theme Comics schools, in which the main Italian and foreign comics schools participated.

The 38th edition, from 25 September to 10 October 2010, was dedicated to women in comics, through the heroin criminologist story, created by Giancarlo Berardi, father of the famous Ken Parker: she is Julia Kendall, who aesthetically remembers Audrey Hepburn. This edition talks about the publishing adventure of a criminologist called Julia, a young woman who works and lives in Garden city, a fictional American metropolis; she is a criminology teacher at the Hollyhock University, but often she cooperates with police in case of investigations that ask her advice. This edition had a very important theme and for this reason, a debate on women was organized with a lesson on stalker, a real event for women, in which for the first time the Rapalloonia prize was given to an external person to the comics world: Alessandra Bucci, the deputy superintendent of state police and official in charge of Homicide police headquarters in Genoa, for her parallel life with Julia.

The 39th edition from the 1st to 16 October 2011, was marked by a negative event, the death of Sergio Bonelli shortly before of exhibition, the editor of Dylan Dog and Tex Willer in 1986, instead created by his father Gian Luigi Bonelli; in addition in this edition was remembered Sergio Cofferati former secretary of Cgil and today MEP with a contribution to his literature. The exhibition was concluded with a press review in honor of Bonelli: for this reason the exhibition was named Happy birthday Dylan Dog. He is the main character of the horror comic "Dylan Dog", created by Tiziano Sclavi, official screenplayer, and inspired to the actor Rupert Everett and his stories set in London, where he lives in Craven Road,7. Bonelli in his career, inherited Tex from his father, started Dylan Dog and created two characters Zagor and Mister No: the first is similar to Tarzan because he uses elements such as West, mysterious forest, Indians and wilderness, while the second one has his features, he's an avid traveler and dreamer, a yankee who said no to war and progress, siding with weakers.

The fortieth edition, from 10 to 25 November 2012, was one of the most significative; although the weather alert of that period, the opening day always took place in the Teatro Auditorium delle Clarisse, with a special conduction on stage of Rudy Zerbi and Luigi Maio, with the screening of a documentary, made by Giancarlo Sordi, in memory of Sergio Bonelli, died one years ago Come Tex nessuno mai. But the beauty of that edition wasn't limited there, in that year were celebrated forty years of exhibition with the exposition of original drawings and the greatest classics of comics world that were shown in the first edition of exhibition. The twenty years of the perfect union between cartoons and kitchen of restaurateur Fausto Oneto; thirty years of Martin Mystère the detective of impossible made by Alfredo Castelli, to resolve mysterious and inexplicable facts in mysterious places, against secret society, ufo, enigmatic characters and creatures of nightmare; and finally sixty years of Carlo Chendi's career, founder of exhibition, with his Mickey Mouse, Paperino and Pepito's exhibition. During the exhibition an important announcement was published:"the city decided to honor Chendi's memory with a street or a square to Walt Disney". Cartoons, therefore, get in to the Rapallo's place names and the Rapallo's castle became Paperopoli. For this reason, the exhibition celebrated these years with the Cartoonist's Celebration edition.
Moreover 30 November was a particular day: Chendi worked as a professor for a day, the exhibition and the teachers of cartoons Chiavari  school agreed on a challenging and interesting project: in secondary schools of the place, were combined boys and children with some of the most popular designers of the time, to explain how a cartoon's story born, from its initial idea to the publication: for example, took part Egle Bartolini, Titti and Silvestro's designer: all these events to carry on a tradition in Rapallo, since it is considered the capital of cartoon.

The 42nd edition, from 27 September to 19 October 2014, was named Sportoonia, an exhibition dedicated to sport. The  main theme was in fact the relationship between the art and sport, not a random choice, just in the year in which Rapallo is the European City of Sport and also because, there are sports activities in comics as it should be in the life of everyone: moreover for the first time of manifestation, were exposed tables and illustration Manga, because the Japanese cartoons are those in which the sport's theme is present enough, starting for example from Holly and Benji and Mila and Shiro.

Catalogs Covers  in different editions of International Cartoonists' Exhibition

The U Giancu's prize 
In 1992, in an autumn night, the U giancu's  prize was born.  The name U giancu comes from the restaurant in which some people were gathered that night: there where the owner of the comic restaurant U giancu, Fausto Oneto, his wife, an Italian stage director Luciano Bottaro, his friend Piero Campana (his historical help at the restaurant) and finally Claudio Bertieri that all of a sudden spoke about the idea to celebrate their common friend, the cartoonist Antonio Canale who died few months before. For this reason they called immediately Emanuele Luzzati, an Italian animator and illustrator, and so they asked him to create a little statue. His invention was The White Pulcinella that became since then the symbol of the price, in fact the term u giancu is in the Genoese dialect and it means the white; Oneto to finish the work decided to put the statue in an elegant box of olive wood made by his carpenter.
At the beginning the prize was given only to a realist designer and to a comic designer: the first prizewinners were Aurelio Galleppini and Francesco Tullio Altan. When Chendi returned to Rapallo in 1996, he asked to Oneto for associating the prize with exhibition, for moving the famous dinner of Cartoonist from Wednesday to Saturday and for awarding the prize also to a screenplayer: for this reason in 1996, the first screenplayer who won the prize was Sergio Bonelli with his stories of Zagor, Mister No and Tex. From that moment, every year the U giancu's prize is given to three people: a comic cartoonist, a scriptwriter and a comic adventure cartoonist; this event is strictly related with the famous International Cartoonists exhibition, in fact it develops in the same day of the show opening, but not in the same place:  cartoonists, authors, comedians, editors, actors in a big dinner and obviously many fans to have an autograph, wait and celebrate the U giancu's prize in the Oneto's  restaurant, that is similar to a cartoon museum in which every year their eat, drink,  laugh, draw and tattle until late at night.

Notes

External links 

 Sito ufficiale
 Ristorante U Giancu
 Tutte le notizie dalla riviera ligure e dall'entroterra
 Spazio Giovani Rapallo - S.Margherita Lig. 
 Rapallo Turismo
 AFNEWS

Cartooning
Culture in Genoa
Tourist attractions in Liguria
Italian comics
Annual events in Italy
Cartooning events
Rapallo